Suthan Suthersan (10 June 1956 – 20 February 2017) was an environmental engineer; he served as the Chief Technical Officer and Executive Vice President of Arcadis North America.

Early life

Dr. Suthersan had his childhood education at the rural schools of Sri Lanka in Mankulam, Kodikamam, Valaichenai, Wattegama and Pesalai due to his father's career at Sri Lanka Railways. He joined Jaffna Central College for his secondary education.

He entered the engineering faculty at the University of Peradeniya and went for his master's degree at the Asian Institute of Technology. He did his Ph.D. in environmental engineering at the University of Toronto.

Career
He joined Clean Harbors in Boston, a pure hazardous waste handling and removal company, and then the Groundwater Technology Inc. at their corporate office in Norwood, Massachusetts.

He later joined Geraghty and Miller which headquartered in Long Island. There he had come under the guidance of David Miller; he introduced him to Steve Blake and both encouraged and enabled him to build the technical foundation to make Geraghty and Miller, which later became Arcadis North America.

Bibliography

References

External links 
 Suthan Suthersan: A Journey from Jaffna (Dr. Suthersan's Blog)
 Arcadis Mourns Loss of Chief Technical Officer Dr. Suthan S. Suthersan
 NGWA mourns passing of Suthan Suthersan

Environmental engineers
1956 births
2017 deaths
Alumni of Jaffna Central College
Asian Institute of Technology alumni
Alumni of the University of Peradeniya
University of Toronto alumni
American people of Sri Lankan Tamil descent
Sri Lankan Hindus
American Hindus
Sri Lankan emigrants to the United States
People from Hopewell Township, Mercer County, New Jersey